Dynamic provisioning environment (DPE) is a simplified way to explain a complex networked server computing environment where server computing instances or virtual machines (VMs) are provisioned (deployed or instantiated) from a centralized administrative console or client application by the server administrator, network administrator, or any other enabled user. The server administrator or network administrator has the ability to parse out control of the provisioning environment to users or accounts in the network environment (end users, organizational units, network accounts, other administrators). The provisioned servers or VMs can be inside the firewall, outside the firewall, or hosted depending on how the supporting pool of networked server computing resources is defined. From the perspective of the end user/client the requested server is deployed automatically.

From an easy-to-use client or desktop application, any administrator or designated end user is able to easily instantiate a server instance or virtual machine (VM) instance. The server instance is provisioned for the eligible administrator or end user without anyone having to physically touch the supporting server infrastructure. While defining the server or VM to instantiate the client application gives the end user or administrator the ability to define the operating system and applications that will run within the server instance to be provisioned automatically.

Desktop dynamic provisioning environment (desktop DPE) or client dynamic provisioning environment (client DPE) is the scenario where a DPE is being used to provision client computing or desktop computing instances.

Origin of DPE (dynamic provisioning environment): First documented in 2007; Cambridge, Massachusetts.

DPE can be a vendor independent environment or an environment defined by a specific vendor. A dynamic provisioning environment (DPE) is flexible and can be defined as supporting a set of heterogeneous applications, defined as supporting a single application, or could be created in an appliance model to deploy a discrete application customized for a specific usage scenario.

From an operating system perspective, a DPE server infrastructure can exist on one server operating system (homogeneous server infrastructure) or exist as on a defined set of servers with different operating systems (heterogeneous server infrastructure). The server instances or VMs provisioned by the DPE could be one specific server operating system or multiple server operating systems. Same idea for client systems instantiated by the DPE. The client instantiated by the DPE could be one or multiple client/desktop operating systems.

Components of a DPE will vary based on the density of the computing environment. Would commonly include, servers or virtual server instances, directory server, network connectivity( TCP/IP), management layer, virtual machine management tools, server provisioning tools, client application, client interface.

References

Computer networking